Reggie Williams (born March 5, 1964) is an American retired professional basketball player who played ten seasons in the National Basketball Association (NBA). He was an All-American college player at Georgetown University and was a member of their 1983–84 National Championship team.

High school and college career
Williams began his career as a McDonald's High School All-American while attending Paul Laurence Dunbar High School in Baltimore, where he played with fellow NBA players Muggsy Bogues, Reggie Lewis, and David Wingate. The 1981–82 Dunbar Poets finished the season at 29–0 during Williams's junior season and finished 31–0 during his senior season, and were ranked first in the nation by USA Today.

He then attended Georgetown and enjoyed an outstanding collegiate career.  In his four seasons at Georgetown, he was amongst career leaders  in scoring, rebounding, assists and steals in school history, finishing no lower than seventh in any category. As a freshman, he scored 19 points and grabbed seven rebounds against the University of Houston in the 1984 national championship game which the Hoyas won 84–75. Williams was named Most Valuable Player of the championship game. As a senior during the 1986–87 season, Williams was the leader of a young team which became a contender for a national championship. During  that season he led the Big East in scoring, and led the team in rebounding, steals and blocked shots, and was third in assists.  Because of Williams's play, it led Georgetown coach Thompson to dub the team "Reggie and the Miracles". The team won a share of the 1986–87 Big East Championship and the Big East Tournament. In the 1987 NCAA tournament, the Hoyas reached the  Southeast Regional Final, but lost to Providence College, 88–73.

Professional career
Williams was selected with the fourth pick overall of the 1987 NBA draft by the Los Angeles Clippers. On December 12, 1987, Williams scored 34 points and grabbed 8 rebounds in a loss against the Seattle SuperSonics.

Williams would spend ten seasons (1987–1997) in the league, playing for the Clippers, Cleveland Cavaliers, San Antonio Spurs, Denver Nuggets (who he spent parts of 6 seasons with, the most of any franchise he played with), Indiana Pacers and New Jersey Nets.

During the 1991-92 NBA season with Denver, Williams played 81 games and averaged career-highs of 18.2 points and 1.8 steals per game. Twice in that season Williams recorded a career-best 7 steals in a single game. On December 1, 1992, Williams scored 35 points and grabbed 9 rebounds in a 112-105 win against the Houston Rockets.

In the 1994 NBA playoffs, Williams played a key role in Denver’s unprecedented upset of the SuperSonics in the first round. It was the first time in league history that an 8 seed beat a 1 seed in the first round.

He retired with career totals of 7,508 points and 2,393 rebounds.

In July 2021, sportswriter Bill Simmons said “I still feel like if Reggie Williams goes to a different team, his entire career is different. The Clippers stamp went right on him,” when discussing the 1987 NBA draft.

Life after the NBA
Williams became the boys' basketball coach at Towson Catholic High School on May 30, 2009. He had previously served in the same capacity at Jericho Christian Academy in Landover, Maryland until it closed several weeks later. In 2010, he became coach at Archbishop Carroll High School in Washington, D.C.  He resigned in February 2013.

References

External links
 Career NBA stats

1964 births
Living people
African-American basketball players
All-American college men's basketball players
American men's basketball players
Basketball coaches from Maryland
Basketball players from Baltimore
Cleveland Cavaliers players
Denver Nuggets players
Georgetown Hoyas men's basketball players
High school basketball coaches in the United States
Indiana Pacers players
Los Angeles Clippers draft picks
Los Angeles Clippers players
McDonald's High School All-Americans
New Jersey Nets players
Parade High School All-Americans (boys' basketball)
San Antonio Spurs players
Shooting guards
Small forwards
21st-century African-American people
20th-century African-American sportspeople